Tension and release may refer to:
Consonance and dissonance
Tension (music)
Musical analysis